The Commander in Chief South was a high-ranking position in the Luftwaffe of Nazi Germany. All Luftwaffe units based in the Mediterranean and North African theatres of World War II fell under this command. 

Commanding officers

Chiefs of Staff

Operations Officers (Ia)

Sources 
 Axis History
 Albert Kesselring by Pier Paolo Battistelli, page 12

German High Command during World War II